Richard Simmons (1737 – 1802) was an English cricketer who played during the 1770s. He is one of the earliest well-known wicket-keepers. Simmons was born and died at Bridge, Kent―he was christened in the village in October 1737 and buried there in November 1802. The earliest definite reference to him is in 1772, when he was 34. He is known to have played in 13 eleven-a-side matches from 1772 to 1779 which have since been given first-class cricket status. Between 1773 and 1775 he played six times for Kent sides before playing twice for Surrey sides between 1778 and 1779. He also appeared for England teams in four matches.

Notes

References

Sources
 
Birley, Derek (1999) A Social History of English Cricket. London: Aurum Press. 
 

1737 births
1802 deaths
Chertsey cricketers
English cricketers of 1701 to 1786
English cricketers
Kent cricketers
Non-international England cricketers
People from Bridge, Kent
Surrey cricketers
Wicket-keepers